Jacob Zachar (born May 16, 1986) is an American actor whose roles include Russell "Rusty" Cartwright on the ABC Family TV Series Greek.

Early years and education
Zachar was born in Chicago, Illinois (his Greek character, Rusty Cartwright, is also from Chicago). He attended St. Francis Borgia grammar school. He also attended St. Patrick High School, an all-boys Catholic school in Chicago.

Career
Zachar booked his first starring role in Greek after living in Los Angeles for only two months. He played the part of Ernest in the film Little Big Top and then appeared as a cashier in the movie Bodega, also in 2006. He has also done commercials for Carl's Jr. and Dunkin' Donuts. He has performed in various theater roles such as On Golden Pond, Prairie Lights, Big: The Musical, Les Misérables and Guys and Dolls.

Zachar provided voices for the movie Surf's Up and an episode of the animated television series King of the Hill where he was a cashier. In 2005, Zachar completed the film Drunkboat in which he stars along with Dana Delany, John Malkovich and John Goodman.

Personal life
While living in Chicago, he was in a metal band called Megaband.  Zachar also sang in a punk/ska group Not Too Good.  He now plays in a blues and funk band part-time.

On May 25, 2019, Zachar married set costumer Brittany Saberhagen after five years of dating.

Filmography

References

External links

1986 births
Living people
American male film actors
American male television actors
Male actors from Chicago